Flikke is a Norwegian surname. Notable people with the surname include:

Geir Flikke (born 1963), Norwegian political scientist
Gunnar Flikke (born 1947), Norwegian newspaper editor
Julia O. Flikke (1879–1965), American nurse

Norwegian-language surnames